Rafael Márquez may refer to:

Rafael Márquez (born 1979) former Mexican footballer who played as a centre back or defensive midfielder.
Rafael Márquez (boxer) (born 1975), Mexican professional boxer
Rafael Márquez Lugo (born 1981), former Mexican footballer who played as a striker
Rafael Márquez Esqueda (1947–2002), Mexican footballer who played as a defender

See also
Rafael Marques (disambiguation)